Shi Letian (born 12 January 2003), is a Chinese footballer who plays as a forward for Jingchuan Wenhui.

Club career
Born in Changji, Xinjiang, Shi started playing football at school, before his parents sent him to Shandong for football training. He played for Shandong Luneng between the ages of 7 and 15, before moving to Spain in 2018 to study at the Marcet Football Academy's program in Catalonia. 

While in Spain, he joined youth academy Neurofutbol, where he scored 20 goals in 24 games at under-16 level. He was promoted to the under-19 team, before a move to professional side Langreo in August 2021. Initially assigned to the under-19 squad, where he made his debut in September 2021, he went on to represent the club's 'B' team in the Tercera División RFEF.

In 2022, he returned to China, signing for Chinese Champions League side Jingchuan Wenhui. He played in Jiangchuan Wenhui's shock penalty shoot-out win over Chinese Super League side Beijing Gouan on 17 November 2022.

Personal life
Shi's father, Shi Yuxin, was also a footballer, but suffered a serious leg injury in a car crash in 1992, forcing him to retire prematurely.

On a brief return to China in 2020, Shi felt ill at the Beijing Capital International Airport, informing staff, and was diagnosed with Coronavirus. He spent a month recovering in the Beijing Ditan Hospital, before donating to the "Coronavirus Prevention and Control" through the Red Cross Society of China.

Career statistics

Club

Notes

References

2003 births
Living people
Footballers from Xinjiang
Chinese footballers
Association football forwards
Tercera Federación players
Shandong Taishan F.C. players
UP Langreo footballers
Chinese expatriate footballers
Chinese expatriate sportspeople in Spain
Expatriate footballers in Spain